Nicolaus Tanner Mears (born October 7, 1996) is an American professional baseball pitcher for the Colorado Rockies of Major League Baseball (MLB). He has played in MLB for the Pittsburgh Pirates.

Amateur career
Mears attended Rocklin High School and played college baseball at Sacramento City College. He signed with the Pittsburgh Pirates as an undrafted free agent in 2018.

Professional career

Pittsburgh Pirates
Mears reached the Double-A Altoona Curve in his first full professional season, though he spent the bulk of the season with the High-A Bradenton Marauders. Across three levels in 2019, Mears threw 46.2 innings, striking out 69 while walking just 18, maintaining a 3.28 ERA while being used exclusively out of the bullpen.

Mears was called up to the majors for the first time on August 8, 2020 and made his major league debut that night, pitching one inning, allowing one run, against the Detroit Tigers. Mears made four appearances with the Pirates that season, throwing five innings and giving up three runs.

Mears began the 2021 season at the Alternate Training Site, and joined the Triple-A Indianapolis Indians when their season began in May. Recalled to the Pirates for the first time on May 26, he didn't make an appearance until his fourth stint with the major league team, which began on July 20.

Mears was placed on the 60-day injured list to begin the year on March 15, 2022, after undergoing arthroscopic surgery on his right elbow. On December 18, 2022, Mears was designated for assignment.

Colorado Rockies
On December 23, 2022, Mears was claimed off waivers by the Texas Rangers. Four days later, Mears was designated for assignment to make room for free-agent signing Nathan Eovaldi.

On January 6, 2023, Mears was claimed off waivers by the Colorado Rockies.

References

External links

1996 births
Living people
Altoona Curve players
Baseball players from Sacramento, California
Bradenton Marauders players
Greensboro Grasshoppers players
Major League Baseball pitchers
Peoria Javelinas players
Pittsburgh Pirates players
Sacramento City Panthers baseball players
West Virginia Black Bears players
Indianapolis Indians players